Bedford Township is one of the twelve townships of Meigs County, Ohio, United States.  The 2000 census found 1,212 people in the township.

Geography
Located in the northern part of the county, it borders the following townships:
Lodi Township, Athens County - north
Carthage Township, Athens County - northeast corner
Orange Township - east
Chester Township - southeast
Salisbury Township - south
Rutland Township - southwest corner
Scipio Township - west
Alexander Township, Athens County - northwest corner

No municipalities are located in Bedford Township, although the unincorporated community of Darwin is located in the township's far north.

Name and history
Statewide, the only other Bedford Township is located in Coshocton County.

Government
The township is governed by a three-member board of trustees, who are elected in November of odd-numbered years to a four-year term beginning on the following January 1. Two are elected in the year after the presidential election and one is elected in the year before it. There is also an elected township fiscal officer, who serves a four-year term beginning on April 1 of the year after the election, which is held in November of the year before the presidential election. Vacancies in the fiscal officership or on the board of trustees are filled by the remaining trustees.

References

External links
County website

Townships in Meigs County, Ohio
Townships in Ohio